Pain or Oh Pain, Little Pain, Pain (Spanish: ¡Ay, pena, penita, pena!) is a 1953 Mexican-Spanish musical comedy film directed by Miguel Morayta and starring Lola Flores, Luis Aguilar and Antonio Badú.

Cast
 Lola Flores 
 Luis Aguilar 
 Antonio Badú 
 Fernando Soto
 Rafael Llamas 
 Miguel Ángel Ferriz 
 Enrique García Álvarez 
 Rafael Estrada 
 Carmen Flores 
 Faíco
 Francisco Aguilera as Guitarist  
 El Trío Aguilillas 
 Mariachi México
 Daniel Arroyo as Hombre en restaurante

References

Bibliography 
 Mira, Alberto. The A to Z of Spanish Cinema. Rowman & Littlefield, 2010.

External links 
 

1953 musical comedy films
Spanish musical comedy films
Mexican musical comedy films
1953 films
1950s Spanish-language films
Films directed by Miguel Morayta
Mexican black-and-white films
Spanish black-and-white films
1950s Spanish films
1950s Mexican films